The Kinston Eagles were a Minor League Baseball team of the Coastal Plain League. They were located in Kinston, North Carolina. The team played its home games at Grainger Stadium, which opened in 1949 and holds 4,100 fans. Prior to that they played in Grainger Park.

The Eagles won the CPL Championship in 1947 as an affiliate of the Atlanta Crackers.

History

Coastal Plain League

The Great Depression took a great toll on the minor leagues, with only thirteen teams operating across the U.S. at a 1933 low point. Like most, Kinston sat out the first few years of the Great Depression but reentered play for the  season in the semi-professional Coastal Plain League. By  the circuit had become a fully professional, Class D league as ranked by the National Association. The city remained in the Coastal Plain League continuously until it was disbanded after . Among the superior talent during this period was a young player named Charlie "King Kong" Keller who is listed as among the top forty major league players of all-time in terms of on-base percentage (.410).

Grainger Stadium

From 1949 on, the Kinston Eagles played their home games at Grainger Stadium located at 400 East Grainger Avenue in Kinston. The original structure was built by architect John J. Rowland in 1949 at a cost of $170,000 inclusive of everything except the land. $150,000 of the money was raised by bond issue. A dedicatory plaque identifies the structure as "Municipal Stadium", but it has been called Grainger Stadium since it was first built.

Season by season results 

TABLE NOTES:
 The record for the 1938 team above were the actual wins and losses for that team. An ineligible player scandal caused the league office to award or take away wins and losses from teams based on their violations of the rules. The "official" adjusted record at the end of the season was 64–45.

No Hitters

 Eddie Nowak (7/31/1939) vs the New Bern Bears

League histories

Newspapers 
  – Issues for all seasons are available on microfilm at Lenoir Community College.

Footnotes 

Baseball teams established in 1937
Lenoir County, North Carolina
Professional baseball teams in North Carolina
Detroit Tigers minor league affiliates
Boston Red Sox minor league affiliates
St. Louis Cardinals minor league affiliates
Baseball teams disestablished in 1952
1937 establishments in North Carolina
1952 disestablishments in North Carolina
Defunct baseball teams in North Carolina
Coastal Plain League (minor league) teams